Ioanna "Gianna" Vlachou (born ) is a Greek volleyball player. She was part of the Greece women's national volleyball team. She competed with the national team at the 2004 Summer Olympics in Athens, Greece. She played most notably for Olympiacos and  Filathlitikos.

Clubs
•	1991-2002 Aias evosmou

•	2002-2005 Filathlitikos Thessaloniki

•	2005-2006 Apollonios Keratsiniou

•	2006-2010 Olympiacos

•	2010-2011 SAAK Anatolia

See also
 Greece at the 2004 Summer Olympics

References

External links
profile at fivb

1981 births
Living people
Greek women's volleyball players
Olympiacos Women's Volleyball players
Place of birth missing (living people)
Volleyball players at the 2004 Summer Olympics
Olympic volleyball players of Greece
Mediterranean Games silver medalists for Greece
Mediterranean Games medalists in volleyball
Competitors at the 2005 Mediterranean Games
21st-century Greek women